The following is a list of media located in, or serving Portland, Maine.

Newspapers
 The Forecaster
The Phoenix
Portland Press Herald 
Maine Sunday Telegram (Sunday edition of the Portland Press Herald)

Magazines
Mainer formerly known as The Bollard (2005-2019)
Down East
Dispatch 
Maine 
Portland Monthly

Radio

FM

AM

References

External links
Portland, ME on American Radio Map (Radiomap.us)

Portland, Maine